The Thega River (Thega Khāl, Kawrpui Lui or Kawrpui River) is a river lying mostly between eastern Bangladesh and Mizoram, India. Its originates from Myanmar(Burma) and is one of the main tributaries of the Karnafuli.

Notes

Rivers of Mizoram
Rivers of Bangladesh
Rivers of India
Rivers of Chittagong Division